The gulf catshark (Asymbolus vincenti) is a species of catshark, found only off the shores of southern Australia at depths between . This species can reach a length of  TL.

References

gulf catshark
Marine fish of Southern Australia
gulf catshark